Mid Fife and Glenrothes is a constituency of the Scottish Parliament (Holyrood) covering part of the council area of Fife. It elects one Member of the Scottish Parliament (MSP) by the plurality (first past the post) method of election. It is one of nine constituencies in the Mid Scotland and Fife electoral region, which elects seven additional members, in addition to the nine constituency MSPs, to produce a form of proportional representation for the region as a whole. Created in 2011, the constituency comprises most of the previous Central Fife constituency which was abolished for the 2011 Scottish Parliament election.

The seat has been held by Jenny Gilruth of the Scottish National Party since the 2016 Scottish Parliament election.

Electoral region 

The other eight constituencies of the Mid Scotland and Fife region are Clackmannanshire and Dunblane, Cowdenbeath, Dunfermline, Kirkcaldy, North East Fife, Perthshire North, Perthshire South and Kinross-shire and Stirling.

The region covers all of the Clackmannanshire council area, all of the Fife council area, all of the Perth and Kinross council area and all of the Stirling council area.

Constituency boundaries and council area 

Fife is represented in the Scottish Parliament by five constituencies, Cowdenbeath, Dunfermline, Kirkcaldy, Mid Fife and Glenrothes and North East Fife.
The seat of Mid Fife and Glenrothes is formed from the following electoral wards, all of which are part of Fife:

Glenrothes West and Kinglassie
Glenrothes North, Leslie and Markinch
Glenrothes Central and Thornton
Leven, Kennoway and Largo

Member of the Scottish Parliament

Election results

2020s

2010s

References

External links

Scottish Parliament constituencies and regions from 2011
Politics of Fife
Constituencies of the Scottish Parliament
Constituencies established in 2011
2011 establishments in Scotland
Glenrothes
Levenmouth